The Thunderdome Stadium, is a football stadium located in Muang Thong Thani, Nonthaburi, Thailand, and is the home of Thai League 1's side, Muangthong United. The stadium was the first operate football stadium in Thailand.

History

Thunderdome Stadium has been the home venue of Muangthong United since 2007. Owned by Sports Authority of Thailand, rented by Muangthong United, the stadium originally known as Thunderdome Sports Complex, it opened in 1998 and had only one main stand before the Thai League 1 promotion in 2009. After the promotion to the top division of Muangthong United, the club started to develop the stadium, construct other temporary stands to hold the demands of the supporter. In 2010, after the club clinched its first ever top division, Thunderdome Stadium was developed into the 4 stands stadium with full installed seats. The capacity rose to 15,000.

Name
The name of the ground changed twice due to sponsorship agreements, the first time it was changed from the original name, Thunderdome Stadium, to Yamaha Stadium following the sponsorship in 2010. In 2012, The stadium was changed its alias to SCG Stadium following the club title sponsor of SCG. However, the stadium is still referred as its official name of Thunderdome Stadium in AFC competitions. In 2020, SCG decided not to renew the contract with the club as the last contract was due to expire in November 2020, ended 8 years as a main sponsor for the club. In 2021-22 season, the club decided to change the stadium back to Thunderdome Stadium once again for the first time since 2010.

Capacity
The stadium used to be able to hold as much as 20,000 spectators but the number reduce after renovation by filling in chairs to make the stadium all seated with the capacity of 15,000 people.

Other events
On 25 November 2012, K-pop artists under S.M. Entertainment featuring Kangta, BoA, TVXQ, Super Junior, Girls' Generation, SHINee, f(x) and EXO, performed the world tour SMTown Live World Tour III in Bangkok in the stadium.

The stadium hosted Korean Pop Sensation Psy on 28 November 2012.

Clash played their final concert here on 30 April 2014, followed by their disbandment.

Guns N' Roses played here on 28 February 2017 as part of their Not in This Lifetime... Tour.

International matches

Attendances
The follows are the average and highest attendances of Muangthong United in their domestic league competitions at SCG Stadium.

References

External links
Stadium information

Muangthong United F.C.
Football venues in Thailand
Buildings and structures in Nonthaburi province
Sport in Nonthaburi province